Stanisław Zdzisław Michalski (3 September 19321 February 2011) was a Polish actor. In 1974 he starred in the Academy Award-nominated film The Deluge which was directed by Jerzy Hoffman.

References

External links

1932 births
2011 deaths
Male actors from Vilnius
People from Wilno Voivodeship (1926–1939)
Polish male film actors
Recipient of the Meritorious Activist of Culture badge